The 1924 New York state election was held on November 4, 1924, to elect the governor, the lieutenant governor, the Secretary of State, the state comptroller, the attorney general, the state treasurer and the state engineer, as well as all members of the New York State Assembly and the New York State Senate.

History
The Socialist state convention met on July 27 at Finnish Hall (at Fifth Avenue/Twelfth Street) in New York City. They nominated Rev. Norman Thomas for Governor and Charles Solomon for lieutenant governor.

The Republican state convention met on September 25 in Rochester, New York. Theodore Roosevelt, Jr., was nominated for governor on the first ballot.

The Democratic state convention met on September 25 in Syracuse, New York, and re-nominated all incumbent state officers.

Result
Almost the whole Republican ticket was elected, only the incumbent Democratic Governor Smith managed to stay in office.

The incumbent Smith was re-elected. The incumbents Lunn, Hamilton, Fleming, Sherman, Shuler and LaDu were defeated. 

The Democratic, Republican and Socialist parties maintained automatic ballot access (necessary 25,000 votes for governor), the Socialist Labor Party did not re-attain it, and the Workers Party did not attain it.  

Florence E. S. Knapp was the first woman elected to a statewide office in New York. She remained the only one for fifty years, until Mary Anne Krupsak was elected lieutenant governor in 1974.

This was the last election of a Secretary of State, a Treasurer and a State Engineer. The Secretary of State has been appointive since January 1927, the other two offices were abolished. The duties of the Treasurer were transferred to the Comptroller, those of the State Engineer to the Superintendent of Public Works which has been always an appointive office.

Notes

References

Sources
New York State Red Book 1925

See also
New York gubernatorial elections

1924
1924 New York (state) elections